, there were about 19,000 electric vehicles in Hawaii. The state has the second-highest number of electric vehicles per capita in the United States, behind California.

Government policy
Several efforts to add more funds were unsuccessful.

In June 2021, Governor David Ige signed three bills relating to electric vehicles into law, that do the following:
 Direct the state government to transition all of its light-duty vehicle fleet to electric by 2035
 Require state agencies that rent vehicles for work trips to prioritize renting electric vehicles
 Restart funding for the state's charging station rebate program

In November 2021, the state started allowing electric vehicles to use high-occupancy vehicle lanes regardless of the number of people in the vehicle.

Charging stations
, there are 363 public charging stations in Hawaii.

The Infrastructure Investment and Jobs Act signed into law in November 2021 includes  for charging stations in Hawaii.

, the state government offers rebates of $1,300–$4,500 for installations of AC charging stations, and $28,000–$35,000 for installations of DC charging stations.

Public opinion
A poll conducted in November 2021 by Coltura showed 66% of voters in Hawaii supporting a complete transition to electric vehicles in the state by 2030.

References

Road transportation in Hawaii
Hawaii